Murfatlar is a town in Constanța County, Northern Dobruja, Romania. It officially became a town in 1989, as a result of the Romanian rural systematization program.

Etymology
The name of the town originates from the Turkish word of Arabic origin murvet (meaning "generous man").

Between 1921 and 1965, and from 1975 to 2007, the locality was known as Basarabi. On June 26, 2007 the lower house of Romania's Parliament, the Chamber of Deputies, approved a proposal to have the name changed back to Murfatlar, which was also ratified by the Senate and promulgated by the president of Romania on December 20, 2007.

Administration
Murfatlar is a port on the Danube–Black Sea Canal and has a population of 11,070. A complex of caves was found carved in the hills nearby, see the Basarabi Cave Complex.

The village of Siminoc (historical name: Turc-Murfat) is administered by the town of Murfatlar. The name of the village comes from the flower Helichrysum arenarium (siminoc in Romanian), which can be found abundantly in the area.

The Murfatlar Vineyard and Basarabi Cave Complex are located nearby.

Demographics

At the 2011 census, Murfatlar had 8,657 Romanians (89.86%), 547 Tatars (5.68%), 236 Roma  (2.45%), 134 Turks (1.39%), 9  Hungarians (0.09%), 3 Aromanians (0.03%), 16 others (0.17%), 32 with undeclared ethnicity (0.33%).

Natives
Murfatlar is the birthplace of the 4th Romanian president, Traian Băsescu.

Image gallery

References

Towns in Romania
Populated places in Constanța County
Localities in Northern Dobruja
Place names of Turkish origin in Romania